The 1948 Star World Championship was held in Cascais, Portugal in 1948.

Results

References

Star World Championships
1948 in sailing
Sailing competitions in Portugal
1948 in Portuguese sport